Dimtsi Weyane (DW or DW TV, also spelled Dimtsi Woyane) is an Ethiopian news-based television and radio network headquartered in Mekelle, Tigray, Ethiopia. Owned by Dimtsi Weyane Tigray P.L.C., it first launched as a radio station in 1980 and in 2018 launched a satellite television channel. The channel broadcasts programming mainly in Tigrinya with some programming in Amharic, Oromo and English.

History 
Dimtsi Weyane was founded as a radio station in 1980 by the Tigrayan People's Liberation Front during its struggle against the Derg regime. Dimtsi Weyane started broadcasting in 2018 on Eutelsat and on an Ethiopian state-owned free-to-air (FTA) TV platform frequency hosted on SES's NSS-12 satellite at 57 degrees East called Ethiosat.

Controversy 
, Dimtsi Weyane as well as Tigray Regional State Television were no longer broadcasting, according to a report by Deutsche Welle Amharic service which cited its Addis Ababa reporter. The Federal Attorney-General launched an investigation on three broadcasters in connection with alleged roles in inciting ethnic violence in Ethiopia.
The result of the investigation on Oromia Media Network (OMN), Asrat Television and Dimtsi Woyane was not announced to the public. Tigray Region authorities have not confirmed the news and the federal government have not issued a statement regarding why the two channels were taken off the air.

See also 
 Television in Ethiopia
 Mass media in Ethiopia

References 

Television in Ethiopia
Television channels in Ethiopia
Television channels and stations established in 2018
Radio stations established in 1980
Satellite television